Kenneth (Ken) Vincent Ticehurst (born 22 January 1945) is a former Australian politician, and was a member of the Australian House of Representatives from November 2001 to 2007, representing the Division of Dobell in New South Wales for the Liberal Party of Australia.

Biography 
Ticehurst has a qualification in electrical engineering. He worked as a manager in marketing and sales, technical and manufacturing and as a managing director before entering politics.
Commenced Kattron, a trading name for his real time Lightning Tracking service, in 1990. Produced first commercial lightning data service in Australia in December 1991. 
Formed a partnership with WeatherBug of USA to install and operate 21st Century Lightning Tracking equipment.

Electoral career 
At the 2001 federal election, Ticehurst was preselected and contested the marginal seat of Dobell held by the Labor Party since its creation in 1984. Ticehurst won the seat with a slim majority of 560 votes, defeating Labor frontbencher Michael Lee.

At the 2004 election, Ticehurst improved his margin, winning by 8904 votes two party preferred. At the 2007 election, Ticehurst campaigned as time permitted, due to the ailing health of wife Trisha, who was in the later stages of aggressive cancer. He was defeated by Labor Party candidate Craig Thomson. His wife died shortly after his electoral defeat.

Parliamentary career 
 Standing Committees (REPS)
 Communications, Information Technology and the Arts
 Environment and Heritage
 Family and Human Services 
 Government Backbench Policy
 Health and Ageing (Chairperson)
 Communications, Information Technology and the Arts
 Education, Science & Training
 Environment and Water Resources
 Transport, Regional Services, Territories and Local Government
 Employment, Workplace Relations & Workforce Participation

References

External links 
 
  (redirects to profile at Parliament of Australia)
 Maiden speech
 Liberal Party of Australia
 NSW Division: Liberal.Party of Australia
 Official Myspace

1945 births
Living people
Liberal Party of Australia members of the Parliament of Australia
Members of the Australian House of Representatives
Members of the Australian House of Representatives for Dobell
21st-century Australian politicians